Perl Best Practices is a programming book focusing on standard practices for Perl coding style, encouraging the development of maintainable source code. It was written by Damian Conway and published by O'Reilly.

References

External links
Perl Best Practices at the O'Reilly online catalog
 Detailed review at Slashdot

2005 non-fiction books
Books about Perl
O'Reilly Media books